Mrs. Carter's Campaign is a 1913 American silent short comedy film directed by Tom Ricketts starring Charlotte Burton.

External links

1913 films
1913 comedy films
Silent American comedy films
American silent short films
American black-and-white films
1913 short films
American comedy short films
Films directed by Tom Ricketts
1910s American films